Wicomico Demonstration Forest is primarily forested land. This area is used by the Maryland Forest Service to demonstrate various timber management techniques and practices.

Six marked recreational trails (4 loops, 2 connecting) are offered, ranging from short hikes to longer day trips.  Motorized vehicles are prohibited on trails, however hiking, horseback riding and bicycling are acceptable uses, trail conditions permitting.

Dark Blue Trail: 2.6-mile loop trail. A parking area for large vehicles is located at the head of the trail on Morris Road. A picnic area is located at the convergence of the loop trail approximately 0.6 miles from the parking area.

Green Trail: 1.0-mile loop trail around the arboretum. This trail shares a section with the White Trail.

Red Trail: 2.2-mile loop trail. This trail shares a section with the White Trail. Growing and mature pine and hardwood forests and a habitat restoration project with an early successional forest plan are the highlights of this trail.

White Trail: 6.1-mile loop trail. This trail shares some sections with the Green and Red Trails. As the longest marked loop trail, this trail features numerous pine stands and management regimes indicative of the Wicomico Demonstration Forest.

Light Blue Trail: 0.8-mile trail that parallels the northwestern portion of the White Trail between Sixty Foot Road and Seymore Road.
Orange Trail: 0.7-mile trail that connects Shavox Road and the White Trail to the Light Blue Trail.

Parking for the Green, Red, and White trails is available at the Wicomico County Forestry Office on Sixty Foot Road. The parking area on Sixty Foot Road can accommodate large vehicles such as horse trailers. Additional parking for the Red, White, Light Blue, and Orange trails is available on Shavox Road, Seymore Road, and Powell Road.

External links
Maryland State Forests
Map of Wicomico Demonstration Forest
Map of Recreational Trails

Maryland state forests
Protected areas of Wicomico County, Maryland